Haseeb Azam (born 7 October 1986) is a Pakistani cricketer who plays for Rawalpindi. He was the joint-leading wicket-taker for Rawalpindi in the 2018–19 Quaid-e-Azam Trophy, with thirty-two dismissals in six matches.

References

External links
 

1986 births
Living people
Pakistani cricketers
Rawalpindi cricketers
Sui Southern Gas Company cricketers
Cricketers from Attock